Thomas Timothy Holden (born March 5, 1957) is an American politician from Pennsylvania who served as a Democratic member of the U.S. representative for  from 1993 to 2013.  Holden was the dean of the Pennsylvania Congressional Delegation during the 112th United States Congress. On April 24, 2012, Holden was defeated in the Democratic primary in his attempt to seek re-election after the boundaries of his district were redrawn.  He is now chairman of the Pennsylvania Liquor Control Board.

Early life, education, and early career
Holden is a lifelong resident of St. Clair, near Pottsville. He graduated from St. Clair Area High School in 1975. In 1980, he earned a bachelor's degree in sociology from Bloomsburg University of Pennsylvania. He became a licensed real estate agent, and later an insurance broker in 1983. He has worked as a probation officer and as Sergeant-at-Arms for the Pennsylvania House of Representatives, and was the sheriff of Schuylkill County from 1985 to 1993.   He identified with many ordinary working people in his district. He is a Roman Catholic.

U.S. House of Representatives

Elections
In the 1990s, he represented Pennsylvania's 6th congressional district based in Reading and including Berks and Schuylkill counties. The district was populated mostly by Reagan Democrats who were still willing to vote Republican in most elections (it voted for George H. W. Bush in 1992, Bob Dole in 1996 and George W. Bush in 2000), but Holden was re-elected four times without serious opposition.

1992

After redistricting, incumbent Democratic U.S. Congressman Gus Yatron decided to retire. In the Democratic primary, Holden defeated the Mayor of Reading, Pennsylvania, Warren Haggerty, and John Reusing 39%-32%-28%. In the general election, he defeated Republican nominee John E. Jones III, a local government solicitor, 52%-48%.

1994
Holden won re-election to a second term by defeating Republican nominee Fred Levering 57%-43%.

1996
Holden won re-election to a third term by defeating Republican nominee Christian Leinbach, a staffer to U.S. Senator Rick Santorum, 59%-41%.

1998
Holden won re-election to a fourth term by defeating Republican nominee John Meckley 61%-39%.

2000
Holden won re-election to a fifth term by defeating Republican nominee Thomas Kopel 66%-34%.

2002

Pennsylvania lost two districts after the 2000 United States Census. The Republican-controlled General Assembly dismantled the 6th, splitting its territory among three other districts. The legislature considered placing Holden's home in Schuylkill County in the 11th District, a heavily Democratic area in northeastern Pennsylvania. This would have forced a primary matchup with Paul Kanjorski, an eight-term Democrat who was slightly more liberal than Holden. Eventually, it moved the largest slice of Holden's old district, including his home, to the Republican-leaning Harrisburg-based 17th District, represented by 10-term Republican George Gekas.

On paper, the redrawn 17th appeared to so heavily favor Gekas that it appeared unwinnable for a Democrat, even one as conservative as Holden. To some, it was blatant gerrymandering to force Holden into retirement. Gekas retained 60% of his former territory, and George W. Bush had carried the newly drawn district with 57% of the vote in 2000. However, to the surprise of many observers, Holden did not retire, instead opting to run in a district that was 65% new to him (a small corner from the even more Republican 9th District was moved to the 17th). Gekas was forced into his first real campaign ever. Holden managed to gain endorsements from much of Gekas' old base, much to Gekas' surprise. Even Gekas' hometown paper, The Patriot-News, endorsed Holden, saying that the 17th was not the same district that elected Gekas in 1982. Gekas got another rude surprise when Holden visited African American neighborhoods such as Uptown and Allison Hill after finding out that Gekas had never set foot in these neighborhoods in his congressional career. He asked the residents of these neighborhoods not to vote for a congressman who didn't bother to visit them. In November 2002, in one of the biggest upsets in recent political history, Holden narrowly defeated Gekas.

2004
Holden ran for re-election against Republican lawyer Scott Paterno, son of legendary Penn State football coach Joe Paterno. Paterno was actively supported by influential Republicans, and President Bush and Vice President Dick Cheney came to the district several times to support him. Nevertheless, Holden won re-election by a comfortable margin even as Bush easily carried the district. In much of the district, he was the only elected Democrat above the county level.

2006

Holden faced Republican Matthew Wertz, an Afghanistan War veteran, in the 2006. However, Wertz dropped out of the race before the general election citing personal reasons and Holden went on to easily win re-election with 65% of the total vote.

2008

In 2008, he faced Republican Toni Gilhooley, a retired Pennsylvania State Trooper and 25-year veteran of the force, whom he defeated with 64% of the vote (one percent less than the previous election).

2010

Holden was challenged by Republican nominee, State Senator Dave Argall, whose state senate district covered much of the eastern portion of the congressional district, including Holden's home. Unlike other Democrats in Eastern Pennsylvania like Paul Kanjorski, Chris Carney and Patrick Murphy, Holden won re-election, and did so with a 12-point margin, defeating Argall 56% to 44%.

Before Holden won the general election, he faced a primary challenge within his own party from political activist Sheila Dow Ford, who ran to the left of Holden, eviscerating the Congressman for voting against the Affordable Care Act in March 2010. Holden defeated Ford by a margin of 65% to 35% in the primary to regain the Democratic nomination.

2012

Holden's district was drastically reconfigured as a result of legislative redistricting done in the Pennsylvania legislature in late 2011 following the results of the 2010 Census.  The district lost Harrisburg and Lebanon, along with its shares of portions of Berks, Dauphin, Lebanon and Perry counties. To make up for the loss in population, the legislature pushed the district well to the north and east, adding Scranton, Wilkes-Barre, Pittston, and Easton, among other various towns in Luzerne, Lackawanna, Carbon, Monroe and Northampton counties. Holden now found himself running in territory that he did not know and that did not know him. The only county retained from his old district was his home county, Schuylkill County. As a result of these changes, the 17th was now considerably more Democratic than its predecessor, nearing 60 percent Democratic registration and leaving Holden vulnerable to a challenge to his left in the Democratic primary.  Also, the League of Conservation Voters put Tim Holden on their "Dirty Dozen" list, targeting him for supporting then-President George W. Bush's energy policy, favoring oil production, and opposing President Obama's policies including development of clean energy.

In the April 24 primary, Holden was defeated by Moosic attorney Matt Cartwright, a considerably more liberal Democrat. Holden's opposition to the Patient Protection and Affordable Care Act and climate change legislation are believed to have contributed to his defeat.  He also could not overcome the demographics of the redrawn district, which was almost 80 percent new to him.

Tenure
Holden was a member of the Blue Dog Coalition.<ref name="Issues">Issues , Tim Holden for U.S. Congress</ref> He was a somewhat conservative Democrat who often bucked his party's voting trend, especially on social issues. For instance, he opposed abortion and gun control. However, he supported Democratic priorities on a number of issues. While Holden voted with a minority of House Democrats in favor of the authorization for the use of U.S. force in Iraq in October 2002 for President George W. Bush, he strongly opposed Bush's "surge" policy in January 2007. While Holden voted against the Patient Protection and Affordable Care Act, the signature legislative domestic policy achievement of President Barack Obama, in March 2010, he did vote for the American Recovery and Reinvestment Act, signed into law by Obama, in February 2009. While Holden voted for legislation supported by President Bush that toughened bankruptcy laws and enacted the Halliburton loophole, he voted for the Dodd–Frank Wall Street Reform and Consumer Protection Act, signed into law by President Obama, in July 2010. According to opencongreess.com, Holden has voted with the Democratic leadership in Congress 73 percent of the time in recent years. He is ranked as one of the top fifteen most conservative Democrats in the House by the National Journal.

In 2011, Rep. Holden became a co-sponsor of Bill H.R.3261 otherwise known as the Stop Online Piracy Act. Holden withdrew his co-sponsorship of SOPA on January 18, 2012.

Committee assignments
Committee on Agriculture
Subcommittee on Conservation, Energy, and Forestry (Ranking Member)
Subcommittee on Livestock, Dairy, and Poultry
Committee on Transportation and Infrastructure
Subcommittee on Aviation
Subcommittee on Highways and Transit

Caucus memberships
German-American Caucus - Co-founded the Caucus with Rep. Jim Gerlach (R-Pennsylvania)
Congressional Arts Caucus
Blue Dog Coalition

Pennsylvania Liquor Control Board
Holden was nominated to the Pennsylvania Liquor Control Board by Gov. Tom Corbett on June 14, 2013. He was unanimously confirmed by the state Senate on November 13, 2013. He was named chairman of the PLCB by Gov. Tom Wolf on Feb. 17, 2015. He was unanimously confirmed for a second term by the state Senate on June 29, 2016, and sworn in on July 11, 2016.

References

 External links 

U.S. Congressman Tim Holden official U.S. House websiteTim Holden For U.S. Congress official campaign website''
 
Profile at SourceWatch
Profile of Tim Holden at the Pennsylvania Liquor Control Board

1957 births
Living people
American Roman Catholics
People from St. Clair, Pennsylvania
Bloomsburg University of Pennsylvania alumni
Pennsylvania sheriffs
Democratic Party members of the United States House of Representatives from Pennsylvania
21st-century American politicians
Catholics from Pennsylvania